Safety Zone is the eighth studio album by American singer-songwriter Bobby Womack. The album was released on October 27, 1975, by United Artists Records. The album debuted at number 147 on the Billboard 200.

Track listing
All tracks composed by Bobby Womack; except where indicated

Personnel
Bobby Womack - guitar, vocals
Scott Mathews - drums
Wah Wah Watson - guitar, associate producer
Louis Johnson, Willie Weeks - bass
Sonny Burke - piano, synthesizer
Herbie Hancock - piano on "I Feel a Groove Comin' On"
James Gadson - drums
Bill Summers - percussion
Greg Wright, Ivory Stone, Julia Tillman Waters, Lorna Willard, Pointer Sisters, The Valentinos - backing vocals

References

1975 albums
Bobby Womack albums
Albums produced by Dave Rubinson
United Artists Records albums